Sparbanken Lidköping Arena is an indoor arena in Lidköping, Sweden. It is the home arena for the bandy team, Villa Lidköping BK. The normal capacity of the arena is 4,500 for bandy games and 12,500 for concerts, and the arena was opened on December 25, 2009.

The attendance record for a bandy game is 5,400 on December 2, 2016 when Villa Lidköping BK played vs district rivals IFK Vänersborg.

See also
 List of indoor arenas in Sweden
 List of indoor arenas in Nordic countries

References

External links 

Official site 

Indoor arenas in Sweden
Buildings and structures in Västra Götaland County
Bandy venues in Sweden
Villa Lidköping BK
2009 establishments in Sweden
Sport in Lidköping
Sports venues completed in 2009